The North West League can refer to:

 North West Football League, Australian rules football league in Tasmania
 North West Hockey League, ice hockey minor league in the United States and Canada
 North West Junior Hockey League, junior ice hockey league in Canada
 Northwest League, Minor League Baseball League in the United States and Canada
 North West Men's League, rugby league competition in England
 North West Merit League, rugby league competition in England
 North West Senior League, cricket league in Ireland
 North West Women's League, association football league in England
 Pacific Northwest League, early baseball league in the United States